Marco Rossi (born 7 July 1963) is an Italian male retired decathlete who participated in the 1987 World Championships in Athletics.

Biography
During his career, Rossi won the gold medal at the 1987 Mediterranean Games. He won seven times in the national championships at the senior level.

Personal best
Decathlon: 7761 pts ( Götzis, 19 June 1988) at the 1988 Hypo-Meeting
100 m: 10.94, long jump: 7.05 m, shot put: 13.80 m, high jump: 1.96 m, 400 m: 49.11;
 110 m hs: 14.52, discus throw: 42.34 m, pole vault: 4.30 m, javelin throw: 51.30 m, 1500 m: 4:22.95

Achievements

National titles
Italian Athletics Championships
Decathlon: 1985, 1986, 1988 (3)
Italian Athletics Indoor Championships
Heptathlon: 1982, 1984, 1986, 1989 (4)

See also
Italian all-time top lists - Decathlon

References

External links
 

1963 births
Living people
Italian decathletes
World Athletics Championships athletes for Italy
Mediterranean Games gold medalists for Italy
Athletes (track and field) at the 1987 Mediterranean Games
Mediterranean Games medalists in athletics
Sportspeople from Bolzano